Tunde Juhasz (born 25 June 1969) is an Australian former cricketer who played as a wicket-keeper and right-handed batter. She appeared in three Test matches and five One Day Internationals for Australia in 1991 and 1992. She played domestic cricket for South Australia.

References

External links
 
 

1969 births
Living people
Cricketers from Adelaide
Australia women Test cricketers
Australia women One Day International cricketers
South Australian Scorpions cricketers
Australian people of Hungarian descent